Mount Semangkok is a mountain in Malaysia with the height of . Its peak borders the states of  Pahang and Selangor, The mountain is the highest point in Selangor. It is located very near to Fraser's Hill. It is the tallest mountain in Selangor.

References

Nature sites of Selangor
Semangkok
Semangkok